Danie Pratama (born 4 November 1995) is an Indonesian professional footballer who plays as a defender for Liga 2 club Karo United, on loan from Sulut United.

Club career 
Danie began to like football since childhood by entering SSB AM TRI then joined with several clubs PSST TRIDADI, SU, PORDA SLEMAN and PSS Sleman.

Danie joined the PS TNI club in the 2017 Liga 1.

In mid July 2017, Danie was released from PS TNI and joined PSMS Medan who competed in 2017 Liga 2.

Honours

Club
PS TNI U-21
 Indonesia Soccer Championship U-21: 2016
PSMS Medan
 Liga 2 runner-up: 2017

References

External links 
 

1996 births
Living people
Indonesian footballers
PSMS Medan players
PS TIRA players
Liga 1 (Indonesia) players
Liga 2 (Indonesia) players
Association football defenders
Sportspeople from Lampung